The maxillary vein, or internal maxillary vein, is a vein of the head. It is a short trunk which accompanies the first part of the maxillary artery.

It is formed by a confluence of the veins of the pterygoid plexus and the interpterygoid emissary vein, and passes posteriorly between the sphenomandibular ligament and the neck of the mandible. It unites with the superficial temporal vein to form the retromandibular vein.

Structure 
The maxillary vein is a short trunk which accompanies the first part of the maxillary artery. It is formed from the merging of the veins of the pterygoid plexus, and the interpterygoid emissary vein. It passes posteriorly between the sphenomandibular ligament and the neck of the mandible. It unites with the superficial temporal vein. It drains into the retromandibular vein (posterior facial vein).

The maxillary vein anastomoses with the retroglenoid vein.

Development 
The maxillary vein may be the embryological origin of the central retinal vein.

History 
The maxillary vein may also be known as the internal maxillary vein.

Other animals 
The maxillary vein is found in many other mammals.

Additional images

References 

Veins of the head and neck